Kreuzbergmaut Hydroelectric Power Station is a run-of-the-river hydroelectric power station on the Salzach. It is located in Pfarrwerfen municipality, state of Salzburg, Austria.

Construction of the power station began in 1993. It was operational in 1995. Kreuzbergmaut is owned by Verbund and Salzburg AG. The operator is Salzburg AG.

Dam 
Kreuzbergmaut dam consists of a weir (length 36 m) with 3 sluice gates on the left side and a machine hall on the right side.

Reservoir
The dam creates a small reservoir with a length of 2.7 km. The normal reservoir level is 537 m a.s.l.

Power station 
The power station contains 2 Kaplan turbine-generators with 9.975 MW each. The total nameplate capacity is 17.7 MW. Its average annual generation is 80 GWh. The turbines were provided by NOELL and the generators by ABB.

The maximum hydraulic head is 10.87 m. The maximum flow per turbine is 97 m³/s.

Gallery

References

External links 

 

Dams in Austria
Hydroelectric power stations in Austria
Gravity dams
Dams completed in 1995
Energy infrastructure completed in 1995
1995 establishments in Austria
Economy of Salzburg (state)
20th-century architecture in Austria